Universal Football Club was an Uruguayan football club based in Montevideo that participated in the Primera División in the 1910s and 1920s before being dissolved.

History 

Universal debuted in Primera División in the 1912 season, finishing in the penultimate position. The club's best performance was in 1919, when it finished 2nd to Nacional.

In 1920 Universal achieved its only official title, the domestic Copa de Honor, that qualified the club to play international Copa de Honor Cousenier, which lost to Boca Juniors by 2–0.

When both Uruguayan football associations, AUF and FUF, merged in 1926, Universal played the 1927 season, which would be its last in the top division of Uruguayan football. The squad finished 20th (last), being relegated to the second division. It is believed the club was dissolved soon after.

Titles
 Copa de Honor (Uruguay) (1): 1920
 Segunda División (1): 1911
 Copa León Peyrou (1): 1919

Notes

References 

Defunct football clubs in Uruguay
Sport in Montevideo
1920s establishments in Uruguay